Ahmed Mostafa Taher (born 21 October 1997) is an Egyptian footballer who plays as a winger for Smouha SC on loan from Gent.

Professional career
Mostafa joined Gent on 31 May 2018 from Petrojet for a fee around $550,000. Mostafa made his professional debut with Gent in a 3-0 Belgian First Division A win over Cercle Brugge on 2 September 2018. On 25 January 2019, Mostafa was loaned out to Smouha SC for the rest of the season in order for him get some valuable match experience. Mostafa had struggled for game time, featuring just eight minutes with the first-team.

International career
Mostafa represented the Egypt U20s at the 2017 Africa U-20 Cup of Nations.

References

External links
 Soccerway Profile
 Gent Profile

1997 births
Living people
Egyptian footballers
Egypt youth international footballers
Belgian Pro League players
Egyptian Premier League players
Petrojet SC players
El Dakhleya SC players
K.A.A. Gent players
Smouha SC players
Egyptian expatriate footballers
Egyptian expatriate sportspeople in Belgium
Expatriate footballers in Belgium
Association football midfielders